Yoshifumi is a masculine Japanese given name.

Possible writings
Yoshifumi can be written using many different combinations of kanji characters. Here are some examples:

義文, "justice, literature"
義郁, "justice, aroma/to move" 
義史, "justice, history"
吉文, "good luck, literature"
吉郁, "good luck, aroma/to move"
吉史, "good luck, history"
善文, "virtuous, literature"
善史, "virtuous, history"
芳文, "virtuous/fragrant, literature"
芳史, "virtuous/fragrant, history"
良文, "good, literature"
良史, "good, history"
慶文, "congratulate, literature"
由文, "reason, literature"
与志文, "give, determination, literature"
嘉史, "excellent, history"
嘉文, "excellent, literature"
喜文, "rejoice, literature"

The name can also be written in hiragana よしふみ or katakana ヨシフミ.

Notable people with the name
Yoshifumi Ayukawa (鮎川 義文, born 1970), Japanese baseball player
Yoshifumi Fujimori (藤森 喜文; born 1958), Japanese hurdler
Yoshifumi Hattori (服部 義文), Japanese photographer
Yoshifumi Hibako (火箱 芳文, born 1951), Japanese General
Yoshifumi Kondo (近藤 喜文, 1950–1998), Japanese animator and director
Yoshifumi Matsumura (松村 祥史, born 1964), Japanese legislator
Yoshifumi Naoi (直井 由文, born 1979), bassist of the band Bump of Chicken
Yoshifumi Ōta (太田 慶文, born 1951), Japanese painter
, Japanese water polo player
, Japanese boxer
Yoshifumi Tajima (田島 義文, 1918–2009), Japanese actor
Yoshifumi Yamada, (山田 祥史, born 1981) Japanese association football player

Japanese masculine given names